The Eremosphaeraceae are a family of green algae in the order Chlorellales.

References

External links

Trebouxiophyceae families
Chlorellales